Danielle De Metz (born 27 July 1938) is a French actress who appeared in movies and television during the 1960s and early 1970s.

Career
Movie columnist Louella Parsons reported that film director Jean Negulesco met De Metz when he was in Paris, France, and told her to contact him if she came to Hollywood, California. When she came and called him, he had no role available, so he put her in school at 20th Century Fox.

De Metz guest starred in such shows as Dr. Kildare, The Man from U.N.C.L.E., The Girl from U.N.C.L.E., The Many Loves of Dobie Gillis, The Tab Hunter Show, My Three Sons,  I Dream of Jeannie, 77 Sunset Strip, Combat!,  Lock-Up,  Perry Mason, Thriller, I Spy, Voyage to the Bottom of the Sea, Alfred Hitchcock Presents and Have Gun - Will Travel. Her film work includes Return of the Fly (1959), Valley of the Dragons (1961), The Magic Sword (1962), Gidget Goes to Rome (1963), The Party (1968),  and Raid on Rommel (1971).

Personal life
De Metz married George De Metz in Paris in 1956. They divorced January 23, 1961, in Los Angeles, California She married Alan "Lanny" Sher in March 1962.

Filmography
 Return of the Fly (1959)
 La ragazza di mille mesi (1961)
 Valley of the Dragons (1961)
 Jessica (1962)
 The Magic Sword (1962)
Odio mortale (1962)
 Duel at the Rio Grande (1963)
 Gidget Goes to Rome (1963)
 The Scorpio Letters (1967)
 The Party (1968)
 Raid on Rommel (1971)

References

External links 

 

1938 births
French television actresses
French film actresses
Living people
20th-century French actresses
Actresses from Paris